Uzunoluk can refer to:

 Uzunoluk, Beyağaç
 Uzunoluk, Kastamonu